Carl Ognibene (born January 25, 1970) is an American professional wrestler, freestyle wrestler and mixed martial artist who is best known as Carl Malenko who competed in Battlarts, Pro Wrestling Fujiwara Gumi, All Japan Pro Wrestling and Pride Fighting Championships.

Professional wrestling career
Trained by Boris Malenko, Carl Contini was transformed into a top flight worker like his step-brothers Joe and Dean. Malenko made his professional wrestling debut in 1993 for Pro Wrestling Fujiwara Gumi in Japan using the name Carl Greco. In 1996, he made his debut for BattlARTS. In 1999, he changed his name to Carl Malenko during his time in BattlARTS andformative years, when he became the top gaijin for BattlARTS in its later years, mainly pushed as a tag wrestler.

Malenko changed his name to Carl Contini in 2003 while working for All Japan Pro Wrestling. His final match for BattlArts took place in 2008. 

In 2011, Malenko made his debut for the independent promotion in Florida, Definitive Wrestling International in a battle royale as the Masked Superstar. He retired form wrestling in 2014.

Championships and awards
AJPW Jr. Champion Carnival (2003)
Battlarts Tag Team League (1999, 2000) - with Katsumi Usuda

Mixed martial arts record

|-
| Loss
| align=center| 6-4
| Danny Babcock
| Submission (armbar)
| Real Fighting Championship 15 - Throwdown
| 
| align=center| 2
| align=center| 4:46
| Tampa, Florida
| 
|-
| Win
| align=center| 6-3
| Tony Sousa
| Submission (punches)
| Real Fighting Championship 11 - Revenge of the Warriors
| 
| align=center| 2
| align=center| 1:06
| Tampa, Florida
| 
|-
| Win
| align=center| 5-3
| Mike Van Meer
| Submission (arm-triangle choke)
| Real Fighting Championship 7 - Night of Champions
| 
| align=center| 1
| align=center| 2:14
| Tampa, Florida
| 
|-
| Win
| align=center| 4-3
| Joe Kennedy
| Submission (punches)
| Real Fighting Championship 6 - Battle of the Bay
| 
| align=center| 1
| align=center| 2:59
| Tampa, Florida
| 
|-
| Win
| align=center| 3-3
| George Allen
| Submission (americana)
| Real Fighting Championship 3 - battle of the Bay
| 
| align=center| 2
| align=center| 1:19
| Tampa, Florida
| 
|-
| Win
| align=center| 2-3
| Edwin Aguilar
| Submission (arm-triangle choke)
| Absolute Fighting Championships 9
| 
| align=center| 1
| align=center| 2:31
| Ft. Lauderdale, Florida
| 
|-
| Loss
| align=center| 1-3
| Allan Goes
| Submission (arm-triangle choke)
| Pride 8
| 
| align=center| 1
| align=center| 9:16
| Tokyo, Japan
| 
|-
| Loss
| align=center| 1-2
| Wanderlei Silva
| Decision (unanimous)
| Pride 7
| 
| align=center| 2
| align=center| 10:00
| Yokohama, Kanagawa, Japan
| 
|-
| Win
| align=center| 1-1
| Egan Inoue
| Decision (unanimous)
| Pride 6
| 
| align=center| 3
| align=center| 5:00
| Yokohama, Kanagawa, Japan
| 
|-
| Loss
| align=center| 0–1
| Ronald McSwain
| N/A
| World Fighting Council
| 
| align=center| N/A
| align=center| N/A
| N/A
|

References

External links
 Wrestling Data profile
 Sherdog profile
 Ognibene profile

1970 births
Living people
American male professional wrestlers
American male sport wrestlers
American male mixed martial artists
Mixed martial artists utilizing freestyle wrestling
People from Tampa, Florida
People from Winter Haven, Florida